Rajupothepalle is a village in T.Narasapuram mandal, Eluru district, Andhra Pradesh, India. As of the 2011 Census of India, it has a population of 1,807 people, with 924 males and 883 females. 1,024 inhabitants were recorded as being literate.

References 

Villages in Eluru district